The UEFA Champions League is a seasonal football competition established in 1955. Prior to the 1992–93 season, the tournament was named the European Cup. The UEFA Champions League is open to the league champions of all UEFA (Union of European Football Associations) member associations (except Liechtenstein, which has no league competition), as well as to the clubs finishing from second to fourth position in the strongest leagues. Originally, only the champions of their respective national league and the defending champions of the competition were allowed to participate. However, this was changed in 1997 to allow the runners-up of the stronger leagues to compete as well, and again in 1999 when third and fourth-placed teams of the said leagues also became eligible. In the Champions League era, the defending champions of the competition did not automatically qualify until the rules were changed in 2005 to allow title holders Liverpool to enter the competition.

Teams that have won the UEFA Champions League three consecutive times, or five times overall, receive a multiple-winner badge. Six teams have earned this privilege: Real Madrid, Ajax, Bayern Munich, Milan, Liverpool, and Barcelona. Until 2009, clubs that had earned that badge were allowed to keep the European Champion Clubs' Cup and a new one was commissioned; since 2009, the winning team each year has received a full-size replica of the trophy, while the original is retained by UEFA.

A total of 22 clubs have won the Champions League/European Cup. Real Madrid hold the record for the most victories, having won the competition fourteen times, including the inaugural edition. They have also won the competition the most consecutive times, with five straight titles from 1956 to 1960. Juventus have been runners-up the most times, losing seven finals. Atlético Madrid is the only team to reach three finals without having won the trophy while Reims and Valencia have finished as runners-up twice without winning. Spain has provided the most champions, with nineteen wins from two clubs. England have produced fourteen winners from five clubs and Italy have produced twelve winners from three clubs. English teams were banned from the competition for five years following the Heysel disaster in 1985. The current champions are Real Madrid, who beat Liverpool 1–0 in the 2022 final for a record-extending fourteenth title.

List of finals

 The "Season" column refers to the season the competition was held, and wikilinks to the article about that season.
 The wikilinks in the "Score" column point to the article about that season's final game.

Performances

By club

By nation
Teams from thirteen nations have been to a Champions League final, and teams from ten of those have won the competition. Since the 1995–96 season, other than Porto's win in 2003–04, the winners have come from one of only four nations – Spain (11), England (6), Germany (4) and Italy (4) – and other than Monaco in 2003–04 and Paris Saint-Germain in 2019–20, the runners-up have all come from the same four nations.

See also
List of European Cup and UEFA Champions League winning managers
List of UEFA Cup and Europa League finals
List of UEFA Cup Winners' Cup finals
List of UEFA Super Cup matches
List of UEFA Europa Conference League finals
List of UEFA Intertoto Cup winners
List of UEFA Women's Cup and Women's Champions League finals

Notes

References

 
UEFA Champions League
European Champion Clubs' Cup
European Cup and UEFA Champions League